Condit or Conditt is a surname.

People
Notable people with the surname include:
 Azubah Caroline Condit (1810-1844), American missionary in Indonesia
 Carl W. Condit (1914–1997), historian of Chicago architecture
 Carlos Condit (born 1984), American mixed martial arts fighter
 Cecelia Condit (born 1947), American artist working in video
 Celeste Condit (born 1965), American professor and scholar of rhetorical criticism
 Gary Condit (born 1948), American politician who served in the House of Representatives from 1989 to 2003
 George Conditt IV (born 2000), Puerto Rican basketball player
 Ira J. Condit (1883–1900), American horticulturist
 Margaret Conditt, American politician of the Ohio House of Representatives
 Mark Anthony Conditt, alleged perpetrator of Austin serial bombings in 2018
 Philip M. Condit (born 1941), American businessman who was Chairman and CEO of Boeing (1996–2003)

Places
 Condit, Ohio, an unincorporated community in Delaware County, in the U.S. state of Ohio
 Condit Crossing, Pennsylvania
 Condit Hydroelectric Project, a development in the U.S. state of Washington

See also
 conDiT musical creation platform from Buenos Aires